Ivan Zaytsev (born 11 November 1988 in Tashkent) is an Uzbekistani javelin thrower. He competed in the javelin throw at the 2012 Summer Olympics and placed 36th with a mark of 73.94 metres.  He competed at the 2016 Olympics, finishing in 26th, with a throw of 77.83.  He has also competed at World Championship-level, at the 2013 World Championships, reaching the final, and finishing 11th with a throw of 78.33.  His personal best is 85.03 metres.

Competition record

Seasonal bests by year
 2007 – 61.14
 2008 – 70.09
 2009 – 75.07
 2010 – 75.32
 2011 – 79.39
 2012 – 85.03
 2013 – 83.79
 2014 – 83.68
 2016 – 83.03
 2017 – 78.66

References

1988 births
Living people
Sportspeople from Tashkent
Uzbekistani male javelin throwers
Olympic athletes of Uzbekistan
Athletes (track and field) at the 2012 Summer Olympics
Athletes (track and field) at the 2016 Summer Olympics
Athletes (track and field) at the 2014 Asian Games
World Athletics Championships athletes for Uzbekistan
Asian Games medalists in athletics (track and field)
Asian Games bronze medalists for Uzbekistan
Medalists at the 2014 Asian Games
20th-century Uzbekistani people
21st-century Uzbekistani people